Avalon Los Angeles CA 24/06/06 is an album recorded and released in 2006 by Sasha.  The entire set was recorded from a live performance at Avalon in Los Angeles, California.  This double CD set is the first mix album to be released on Instant Live.

Track listing

Disc one
Badger - "Stop Clock" (Part 1)
Booka Shade - "Night Falls"
Gabriel Ananda & Cio D'or - "Lauschgoldengel"
Minilogue - "The Girl from Botany Bay"
Minilogue - "Ahck"
John Tejada - "Forces Fiction"
Lindstrøm - "I Feel Space" (M.A.N.D.Y. Remix)
Rusty - "Body Hunter"
Tomie Nevada - "Meeting at the Cornfields"
Robert Babicz - "My Blue Car"
Andrea Doria - "Deep Throat"

Disc two
Radio Slave - "My Bleep" (Roman Flügel Remix)
Nils Noa - "Monkeybreak"
Martin Eyerer and Toni Rios - "Duende" (Lost in Robert Babicz Space Remix)
Joel Mull - "Begun the End Has"
Minilogue & K.A.B. - "That's a Nice Way to Give Me Feedback"
Tim Deluxe - "Espoo's Rose"
Colder - "To the Music" (Lotterboys Dub)
Gus Gus - "Mallflowers"
Gebrünn Gebrünn - "Paul Kalkbrenner" / Badger – "Stop Clock" (Part 2)

External links

Sasha (DJ) albums
2006 live albums